Steven James Adams is an English musician who co-founded Broken Family Band and Singing Adams.

In 2014 he released his first solo album, House Music, with contributions from Dan Mangan, Justin Young from The Vaccines, Martin Green from Lau and Emily Barker.

Adams's second solo album, Old Magick, which was produced by Dan Michaelson, was released in March 2016 on Fortuna Pop!.

Adams has also written for The Guardian, and The Times newspapers, as well as for The Stool Pigeon music paper. In 2006, he was commissioned by The Today Programme to write a song commemorating the show broadcasting from Glastonbury Festival. In 2008, he was commissioned to write a song for BBC Radio 3's The Verb. as well as a Christmas song for The Today Programme.

Discography

Solo releases
House Music (1 September 2014), The state51 Conspiracy
Old Magick (March 2016), Fortuna POP!

As Singing Adams
Everybody Friends Now (4 April 2011), Records Records Records
Moves (10 December 2012), Records Records Records

With Broken Family Band
Please and Thank You (April 2009), Cooking Vinyl
Hello Love (July 2007), Track & Field
Balls (February 2006), Track & Field
Welcome Home, Loser (February 2005), Track & Field
Jesus Songs (2004), The state51 Conspiracy
Cold Water Songs (June 2003), Snowstorm Records

As Steven Adams and The French Drops
Virtue Signals (February 2018), Hudson Records
Keep It Light (August 2020), Fika Recordings

References

External links

Living people
Year of birth missing (living people)
People from Cambridge
English rock musicians